Ken Keyes may refer to:

 Ken Keyes Jr., author and lecturer
 Ken Keyes (politician)